Scott Eatherton (born December 26, 1991) is an American basketball player who played for Nagoya Diamond Dolphins of Japan's B.League. He played college basketball for the Saint Francis Red Flash and the Northeastern Huskies.

Eatherton was born in Orlando, Florida and raised in Hershey, Pennsylvania. After a prep career at Hershey High School, he signed with Saint Francis University of Loretto, Pennsylvania. After two seasons he transferred to Northeastern University in Boston, where as a senior he was named to the Colonial Athletic Association (CAA) all-defensive team and first-team all-conference.

Undrafted out of college, Eatherton signed with Fortitudo Agrigento in Italy for the 2015–16 season. He then moved to Germany, first for BG Göttingen for a season, and then to Löwen Braunschweig, where he would play three seasons. In his final season, he averaged 17.7 points and 8.2 rebounds per game.

For the 2020–21 season, Eatherton moved to Baxi Manresa of Spain's Liga ACB.

Career statistics

Liga Endesa

Regular season 

|-
| style="text-align:left;"| 2020–21
| style="text-align:left;"| Manresa
| 36 || 25 || 22.9 || .592 || .434 || .752 || 5.6 || 1.4 || .6 || .3 || 13.9

B.League

Regular season 

|-
| style="text-align:left;"| 2021–22
| style="text-align:left;"| Nagoya
| 22 || 22 || 28.5 || .635 || .303 || .725 || 8.7 || 2.6 || .9 || .5 || 18.6

Source: basketball-stats.de (Date: 28. January 2022)

References

External links
Liga ACB profile
Northeastern Huskies bio
Saint Francis Red Flash bio
Basketball-Stats Player profile

1991 births
Living people
American expatriate basketball people in Germany
American expatriate basketball people in Italy
American expatriate basketball people in Spain
American men's basketball players
Basketball Löwen Braunschweig players
Basketball players from Pennsylvania
Bàsquet Manresa players
BG Göttingen players
Centers (basketball)
Fortitudo Agrigento players
Liga ACB players
Northeastern Huskies men's basketball players
People from Hershey, Pennsylvania
Saint Francis Red Flash men's basketball players